The Pamenar Mosque, Mehdishahr dates from the Sasanian Empire (Initial building) and is located in Mehdishahr.

References

Buildings and structures in Semnan Province
Mosques in Iran
Mosque buildings with domes
National works of Iran